Lower Sackville is a community within the urban area of Halifax Regional Municipality, in Nova Scotia, Canada.

History

Before the European colonization in 1749, the Mi'kmaq lived in this area for thousands of years.

In August 1749, Captain John Gorham, acting on orders from Governor Edward Cornwallis to establish a military fort named Fort Sackville. (The community was named after George Germain, 1st Viscount Sackville.). As the community grew, the oak trees that lined the main drive were cut down one-by-one due to poor urban planning. As more homes were desired, the farmlands made way for further urbanization.

In the 1950s and 1960s it was a destination for Haligonians seeking entertainment at the drive-in theater, a harness racing track (Sackville Downs), and a World War II bomber-plane ice cream place. Sackville Downs closed in 1986.

A result of its unincorporated status before 1996, Lower Sackville and adjacent unincorporated communities such as Middle Sackville and Upper Sackville did not benefit from appropriate planning and are examples of urban sprawl. The community's growth reflects its north-central location within the urban area, near the communities of Dartmouth and Halifax. Proximity to Bayers Lake Business Park, Burnside Business Park, and the Downtowns of Halifax give the community the advantages of employment-opportunities--and--services of a larger municipality, and is typical of most commuter communities experiencing growth in North America.

Before amalgamation into the Municipality of Halifax in 1996, Lower Sackville was an unincorporated part of Halifax County.

On 1 April 1996, Halifax County was dissolved and all of its places (cities, suburbs, towns, and villages) were turned into communities of a single-tier municipality named Halifax Regional Municipality. Subsequently, Lower Sackville was turned into a community within the new Municipality of Halifax.

Today, Lower Sackville is a thriving bedroom community of the Municipality of Halifax with many established businesses, parks, and places of interest.

Geography

Lower Sackville is east of Lucasville; north--north-east of Bedford; south-east of Middle Sackville; and south-west of Windsor Junction. 

Districts of Lower Sackville
The following are the districts of Lower Sackville, their geographical location, and/or main road:

Cobequid - Upper half of Cobequid Road
Downtown - Upper half of Sackville Drive, close to Beaver Bank Road
East Sackville - First Lake Drive
Industrial Park - Lower half of Cobequid Road and Glendale Avenue
North Sackville - Stokil Drive and Armcrest
Olde Sackville - Old Sackville Road and Riverside Estates
Sackville Estates - Below Century Park, connected to Millwood
Seawood - Seawood Avenue
South Sackville - Between the lower half of Sackville Drive and Glendale Drive, also includes Chandler Peninsula
Stonemount - Stonemount Drive
Sunnyvale - Sunnyvale Crescent
West Sackville - Riverside Drive
Walker Area - Walker Avenue

Some neighbourhoods of Lower Sackville are also known by their tendency to use street names starting with the same letter:
"C" Section: Cavalier Dr, Cavendish Dr, Cartier Cres, Cabot Cres, Crimson Dr
"L" Section: Lennox Dr, Lumsden Cres, Lynville Dr, Lydgate Dr
"N" Section: Nordic Cres, Neilly Dr, Nappan Dr, Newcombe Dr, Nictaux Dr
"P" Section: Polara Dr, Polara Ct, Phoenix Cres
"Q" Section: Quaker Cres, Quinn Dr, Queens Ct
"R" Section: Rogers Dr, Rankin Dr, Riverside Dr, Rothesay Ct
"S" Section: Smokey Dr, Stokil Dr, Sampson Dr, Saratoga Dr, Saturn Dr, Spinner Cres, Sappire Cres

Other streets are notable for having their namesakes the Fathers of Canadian Confederation: Brown, Cartier, Chandler, Chapais, Cockburn, Coles, Dickie, Haviland, Howland, Johnson, Langevin, MacDougall, McGee, Mowat, Nelson, Pope, Shea, Steeves, Tache, Tilley, Tilloch, and Wilmot.

Parks and Recreation

Arenas
Sackville Sports Stadium

Community Centres
Acadia Centre
Kinsmen Community Centre
Sackville Heights Community Centre

Library
Sackville Public Library

Museums
Fultz House

Parks
Acadia Park
Sackville Lakes Provincial Park

Pools
Sackville Sports Stadium

Trails
Bedford-Sackville Connector

Demographics
The only demographic information that pertains to Lower Sackville is provided by Halifax Regional Council, and pertains to District 15 (Lower Sackville). District 15 (Lower Sackville) has 21,379 people living within its boundaries. However, the community itself does not have any recent demographic information.

Economy
Lower Sackville has experienced ribbon/strip-style commercial development along Trunk 1 since the 1960s. Current retail chains include Canadian Tire, Cleve's Sporting Goods, Dollarama, Giant Tiger, Sobeys, and Atlantic Superstore. There are numerous independent restaurants-and-retailers located in this area as well. Most of the restaurants in the area are of the fast food variety, as well as other establishments that serve various cuisines.

Transportation
The community is north-centrally located within the urban area of Halifax. Highway 101, Highway 102, Route 354, and Trunk 1 (Sackville Drive within Lower Sackville) are highways that connect the community to the rest of the urban area, or beyond.

Lower Sackville is serviced by many transit routes via the Cobequid Terminal near the southern-part of the community, or the Sackville Terminal near the northern-part of the community. The transit-user can use various routes to arrive at another community within the urban area, or elsewhere.

Halifax Transit Routes

Route 8 (Sackville)
Route 82 (First Lake)
Route 83 (Springfield)
Route 84 (Glendale)
Route 85 (Millwood)
Route 86 (Beaver Bank)
Route 87 (Sackville-Dartmouth)
Route 88 (Bedford Commons)
Route 93 (Bedford Highway)
Route 182 (First Lake Express)
Route 183 (Springfield Express)
Route 185 (Millwood Express)
Route 186 (Beaver Bank Express)

Education
Lower Sackville has eight schools to choose from; four Elementary Schools, three Junior High Schools, and one High School. They are all administered by the Halifax Regional Centre for Education.

Elementary Schools
Caudle Park Elementary
Hillside Park Elementary
Smokey Drive Elementary
Sycamore Lane Elementary

Junior High Schools
A.J. Smeltzer Junior High
Leslie Thomas Junior High
Sackville Heights Junior High

High Schools
Sackville High School

Notable people
Charles Fenerty, inventor of newsprint made from wood pulp.
Corey LeRue, musician in Canadian Pop Band Neon Dreams.
Brad Marchand, NHL player for the Boston Bruins. (Originally from Lower Sackville but grew up in Upper Hammonds Plains, Nova Scotia)
Adrian Morris, musician in Canadian Pop Band Neon Dreams.
Nikki Payne, award-winning stand-up comedian and contestant on the 2006 edition of NBC television's reality show Last Comic Standing. Also, frequent juror on MuchMusic's show Video on Trial.  She attended Millwood High School.
James Sheppard, NHL player for the New York Rangers.

References

External links
 Official site

Communities in Halifax, Nova Scotia